The 2023 Mississippi elections will take place on November 7, 2023, with the primary on August 8. All executive offices in the state up for election, as well as all 52 seats of the Mississippi State Senate, all 122 seats in the Mississippi House of Representatives, and many local offices. The qualifying deadline for all 2023 Mississippi races was February 1, 2023.

Special elections also will take place during the year.

State House of Representatives

State Senate

Governor

Lieutenant Governor
One-term Republican Incumbent Delbert Hosemann was elected in 2019 with 60% of the vote. He has announced that he is running for re-election.

Republican State Senator Chris McDaniel has also announced his candidacy, challenging Hosemann.

Republicans Shane Quick (who ran against Hosemann in 2019) and Tiffany Longino have filed for the race, as has Democrat D. Ryan Grover, a former candidate for the Oxford Board of Aldermans.

Secretary of State
After considering challenging Tate Reeves in the 2023 Mississippi gubernatorial election, Michael Watson elected instead to run for re-election as Mississippi Secretary of State.

Former Mississippi Secretary of State Staffer and 2022 Democratic Nominee for Mississippi's 3rd Congressional District Shuwaski Young has announced his bid to replace Watson.

Attorney General
One-term Republican Incumbent Lynn Fitch was elected in 2019 with 57.83% of the vote, becoming the state's first Republican Attorney General since 1878. She is running for re-election.

Democratic Attorney and Disability Rights Mississippi Litigation Director Greta Kemp Martin is running to challenge Fitch.

State Auditor
Incumbent Republican Shad White was appointed as Auditor in 2018, winning his first full term unopposed in 2019. White is running for re-election.

The Mayor of Anguilla, Democrat Larry Bradford, is challenging White in the general election.

State Treasurer
One-term Republican Incumbent David McRae was elected in 2019 with 60.8% of the vote. He has announced that he is seeking re-election, and is running unopposed in the Republican Primary.

McRae will face a rematch in the general election, as former Bolton Board of Aldermans Member Addie Lee Green was the only Democrat to announce a run. Lee Green received 39.2% of the vote in 2019.

Commissioner of Agriculture and Commerce
Two-term Republican Incumbent Andy Gipson was re-elected in 2019 with 58.7% of the vote. Gipson is running for re-election, and is the only Republican on the ballot.

Four Democrats have announced that they are challenging Gipson:

 Robert Bradford, Director of Natchez-Adams County Homeland Security Program, Floodplain Management Program, Emergency 9-1-1 Coordinator, and Emergency Management Agency.
 Robert Briggs
 Bethany Hill
 Terry Rogers II

Commissioner of Insurance
Four-Term Republican Incumbent Mike Chaney was reelected in 2019 with 61.26% of the vote. Chaney, who also serves as the state's Fire Marshal, is running for re-election.

Republican Mitch Young, a former US Navy Petty Officer and Candidate for Governor in 2015 has announced a primary challenge against Chaney.

Democratic Attorney and 2022 Court of Appeals in District Four Candidate Bruce Burton has also announced a run.

Public Service Commission

Northern District 
Four-term Democratic Incumbent Brandon Presley was re-elected unopposed in 2019. Presley has announced that he will not run for a fifth term, instead opting to run for Governor.

No Democrats filed to run to succeed Presley, leaving the field open for three Republican challengers to run for the open seat:

 Chris Brown, Mississippi State Representative for the 20th District.
 Mandy Gunasekara, Former Environmental Protection Agency Chief of Staff.
 Tanner Newman, Tupelo Planning and Zoning Administrator.

Central District 
One-term Republican Incumbent Brent Bailey was elected in 2019 with 50.3% of the vote. He is running for re-election.

Bailey's 2019 Democratic Opponent, now-State Representative De’Keither Stamps, is facing him again in a rematch.

Southern District 
One-term Republican Incumbent Dane Maxwell was elected in 2019 with 62.6% of the vote. Maxwell will be challenged in the primary by Nelson Wayne Carr.

Transportation Commission

Northern District 
One-term Republican Incumbent John Caldwell was elected in 2019 with 63.2% of the vote. He is running for re-election unopposed.

Central District 
One-term Democrat Incumbent Willie Simmons was elected in 2019 with 51.1% of the vote. He is running for re-election.

Ricky Pennington Jr., a Republican, is also running for the seat.

Southern District 
Three-term Republican Incumbent Tom King won re-election unopposed in 2019. On November 16, 2022, King announced he would retire at the end of his term and not seek re-election.

Republican State Representative for the 111th District Charles Busby will face off against Independent Steven Brian Griffin.

References

2023 elections in the United States by state
2023 Mississippi elections